Édouard Bamberger (25 September 1825, Strasbourg – 8 July 1910) was a French republican politician. He was a member of the National Assembly from 1871 to 1876 and of the Chamber of Deputies from 1876 to 1881.

References

1825 births
1910 deaths
Politicians from Strasbourg
Alsatian Jews
Jewish French politicians
Opportunist Republicans
Members of the National Assembly (1871)
Members of the 1st Chamber of Deputies of the French Third Republic
Members of the 2nd Chamber of Deputies of the French Third Republic